The Missoula Symphony Orchestra is an American orchestra and 501c3 non-profit organization based in Missoula, Montana. It is affiliated with the Missoula Symphony Chorale with which they make up the Missoula Symphony Association.  The association holds five two-performance concerts a year at the University of Montana Dennison Theatre in addition to an outdoor summer concerts Downtown Missoula, two Youth Concerts, and a Family Concert.

The Missoula Symphony Association was organized in 1954 by Eugene Andrie and comprised faculty and staff from the University of Montana.  It performed its first concert on April 3, 1955 and was accepted into the American Symphony Orchestra League a year later.  The Missoula Symphony Chorale was organized in 1962 and finally the Missoula Symphony Association was formed in 1976.

References

External links
  Missoula Symphony Orchestra and Chorale
 Montana Symphonies

American orchestras
Musical groups established in 1954
Tourist attractions in Missoula, Montana
Wikipedia requested audio of orchestras
Musical groups from Montana
Culture of Missoula, Montana
1954 establishments in Montana
Performing arts in Montana